Withington and West Didsbury railway station (previously named Withington railway station and Withington & Albert Park railway station) is a former station in West Didsbury, in the southern suburbs of Manchester, England, United Kingdom. The station was located on Lapwing Lane, close to the junction with Palatine Road and opposite Withington Town Hall. Nothing now remains of the old station buildings, which have been demolished. West Didsbury is now served by West Didsbury tram stop which is approximately  further down the line from the original railway station.

History

In 1873, the Manchester South District Railway obtained permission to construct a new railway line from Manchester to Alderley. The company fell into financial difficulty and was eventually bought out by the Midland Railway in 1877, who went on to build the line.

There was uncertainty concerning the station name; four years later in 1884, the Midland Railway decided to rename the station Withington and Albert Park, possibly in an effort to associate it with the fashionable Albert Park housing development and to attract more passengers. In 1915 the station was renamed once again, to Withington & West Didsbury, reflecting its geographical location.

The line ran south through West Didsbury via a cutting, passing underneath Palatine Road. Withington & West Didsbury Station was situated on the north side of Lapwing Lane, set back from the road with a small forecourt area. The building incorporated a booking hall, a parcels office, and ladies' and gentlemen's waiting rooms as well as a two-storey station master's  house. There were two platforms in the cutting with glass canopies and a footbridge. Withington Town Hall, which stood opposite the station, was built for Withington Local Board around 1880–90.

From 1923, the MR was absorbed into the LMS, and after 1948 the line became part of British Rail.

Closure

After the station's initial popularity, passenger use from Withington & West Didsbury declined after 1900, possibly brought about by competition from Manchester Corporation Tramways, which opened a tram line along Palatine Road to West Didsbury in 1900. When the former London & North Western Railway line from  became the principal route for London express trains, the South District Line lost its importance. 

In the postwar period, the South District Service declined in frequency, and in 1961 British Rail decided to close the station due to low footfall. The last passenger train departed Withington & West Didsbury station on 2 July 1961. Passenger express and freight trains continued to run through West Didsbury until the line was fully closed in 1969.

The station building was demolished around 1969. Nothing remains today of the old Midland Railway station building, and the site today is occupied by a block of flats.

Line re-opening
The former South District Line lay derelict for several decades. In 1984, Greater Manchester Council and the Greater Manchester Passenger Transport Executive announced the Project Light Rail scheme to develop a new light rail/tram system by re-opening use of disused railway lines in the region, including the route through West Didsbury. The first phase of the Manchester Metrolink system opened in 1992, but it was not until 2013 that the network was expanded to reach West Didsbury. Tram tracks were laid along the former trackbed, but as West Didsbury station had been demolished over 40 years earlier, it was decided to locate the new West Didsbury tram stop approximately  further down the line from the original railway station, on the other side of Palatine Road.

See also
Sheffield and Midland Railway Companies' Committee
Transport in Manchester

References

Citations

Sources

External links

Didsbury
Former Midland Railway stations
Manchester South District Line
Railway stations in Great Britain opened in 1880
Railway stations in Great Britain closed in 1961